Lodi Methodist Church is a historic Methodist church located at Lodi in Seneca County, New York.  It was constructed in 1880 and it consists of a main block with four steeply pitched gables, a corner bell tower, and a large single story rear wing.   It is built of brick with a coursed stone foundation and water table.  It was designed by noted church architect Warren H. Hayes (1847–1899).

It was listed on the National Register of Historic Places in 1982.

Gallery

References

External links

Churches on the National Register of Historic Places in New York (state)
Methodist churches in New York (state)
Churches completed in 1880
19th-century Methodist church buildings in the United States
Churches in Seneca County, New York
National Register of Historic Places in Seneca County, New York